Maisons-Alfort–Alfortville is a railway station in Maisons-Alfort and Alfortville, Val-de-Marne, Paris, France. The station was opened on 12 August 1849 and is on the Paris–Marseille railway. The station is served by the Paris express suburban rail system, the RER. The train services are operated by SNCF. –

Train services
The station is served on the following routes:

Local services (RER D) Goussainville–St Denis–Paris–Villeneuve St Georges–Combs la Ville–Melun
Local services (RER D) Paris–Villeneuve St Georges–Juvisy–Évry Centre–Corbeil Essonnes
Local services (RER D) Creil–Orry la Ville–Gouissainville–St Denis–Paris–Villeneuve St Georges–Juvisy–Évry–Corbeil Essonnes
Local services (RER D) Villiers-le-Bel–St Denis–Paris–Villeneuve St Georges–Juvisy–Évry Centre–Malesherbes

See also 

 List of stations of the Paris RER

External links

 

Railway stations in Val-de-Marne
Réseau Express Régional stations
Railway stations in France opened in 1849